Scott Ferris (November 3, 1877 – June 8, 1945) was a U.S. Representative from Oklahoma.

Early life
Ferris was born in Neosho, Missouri to Scott and Annie M. Ferris. He attended the public schools and was graduated from Newton County High School in 1897 and from the Kansas City School of Law in 1901. He was admitted to the bar in 1901 and commenced practice in Lawton, Oklahoma, the same year. On June 23, 1906, he married Grace Hubbert, the daughter of a prominent attorney, George Washington Hubbert.

Career

Ferris served as member of the territorial Oklahoma House of Representatives in 1904 and 1905. Upon the admission of Oklahoma as a State into the Union, Ferris was elected as a Democrat to the 60th Congress. He was reelected to the 61st and to the six succeeding Congresses and served from November 16, 1907, until March 3, 1921.  He served as chairman of the Committee on Public Lands (62nd through 65th Congresses). He did not seek renomination as a Representative, but was an unsuccessful candidate for Senator. He won the Democratic primary against incumbent Thomas P. Gore but was defeated in the general election by Republican John W. Harreld, receiving 45 percent of the vote.

In 1912 and in 1916 Ferris served as delegate to the Democratic National Conventions. He moved to New York City and engaged in the oil business from 1921 to 1924. Returning to Oklahoma in 1925, he served as Democratic National Committeeman from Oklahoma from 1924 to 1940. He resumed the practice of law; engaged in the oil business and in agricultural pursuits.

His wife, Grace Hubbert Ferris, died unexpectedly of a cerebral hemorrhage on March 9, 1944.

Death
Ferris died in Oklahoma City, Oklahoma County, Okla., June 8, 1945 (age 67 years, 217 days). He is interred at Rose Hill Burial Park, Oklahoma City.

References

External links
 Encyclopedia of Oklahoma History and Culture - Ferris, Scott
 

1877 births
1945 deaths
People from Neosho, Missouri
University of Missouri–Kansas City alumni
Oklahoma lawyers
Members of the Oklahoma Territorial Legislature
Democratic Party members of the United States House of Representatives from Oklahoma